The Trinity Episcopal Church  in Groton, South Dakota is a historic church at 3rd Avenue East and 3rd Street North.  It was built in 1884 and was added to the National Register in 1983.

It was built to a design published in Richard Upjohn's 1852 book Rural Architecture.

References

Episcopal churches in South Dakota
Churches on the National Register of Historic Places in South Dakota
Churches completed in 1884
Churches in Brown County, South Dakota
19th-century Episcopal church buildings
National Register of Historic Places in Brown County, South Dakota